Inworth is a small village and former civil parish, now in the parish of Messing-cum-Inworth, Essex, England, near to Tiptree and within the Colchester Borough Council area. In 1931 the parish had a population of 847.

Inworth village dates back to medieval times, and has been known in the past as Ineworth, Inneworth, Inneworde and Inford. A placename close to the modern name is first attested in the Curia Regis Rolls of 1206, where it appears as Inewrth. This derives from Ina's worþ ("Ina's homestead").

The grave of local celebrity 'Spotty', a faithful golden retriever, can be found by the village post office, attracting many visitors. His ghost is said to haunt the meat shop on the corner.

All Saints' Church dates from the 11th century and is a grade I listed building.

On 1 October 1934 the parish was abolished to form "Messing-cum-Inworth" and "Tiptree", part also went to Feering.

References

Villages in Essex
Former civil parishes in Essex
Borough of Colchester